Ivanka Valkova (born 28 October 1949) is a Bulgarian sprinter. She competed in the women's 100 metres at the 1972 Summer Olympics.

References

1949 births
Living people
Athletes (track and field) at the 1972 Summer Olympics
Bulgarian female sprinters
Olympic athletes of Bulgaria
Place of birth missing (living people)
Olympic female sprinters
20th-century Bulgarian women
21st-century Bulgarian women
Universiade medalists in athletics (track and field)
Universiade silver medalists for Bulgaria